Greenfield Park is a former city in southwestern Quebec, Canada. It is currently a borough of the city of Longueuil. Greenfield Park is the only borough of Longueuil that has an officially bilingual status. It is primarily a post-WWI suburban area. Like the other two boroughs, most of the buildings in Greenfield Park are single-family homes. Nearly all of the land in Greenfield Park is built on, making it Longueuil's most densely populated borough.

Greenfield Park is divided into two sections. The older section of the borough is to the west of Taschereau Boulevard near Saint-Lambert, LeMoyne and Brossard, while the newer section is to the east, near the Laflèche neighbourhood. Most of the Greenfield Park's businesses are located along Taschereau Boulevard, the south shore's most important commercial artery. The Charles LeMoyne Hospital, located on the Taschereau Boulevard, is the largest on the south shore.

History
Seigneury of Longueuil
Before becoming a town, the area known as Greenfield Park was land belonging to the Seigneury of Longueuil. It had been an agricultural area up until the end of the 19th century. Greenfield Park benefited from its proximity to neighbouring St. Lambert's rail line connected to the newly constructed Victoria Bridge, which was the only major rail link between Montreal and the South Shore. At the time, the bridge was the longest railway bridge in the world. Development had begun to spread into Greenfield Park, which merited the establishment of a town to provide services for the population.

Town
Greenfield Park was named after the area's primary geographical features, which were in fact 'green fields' and forests. The town was established on March 24, 1911. The original Charter of Greenfield Park gave reasoning for the town's creation:
Whereas the rate-payers of the territory comprised in cadastral lots Nos . 225 to 244 of the parish of Longueuil have by a large majority in number and value represented that, in consequence of the rapid increase of population within the said territory being a suburb of the city of Montreal and in consequence of the necessity for local improvements similar to those of other suburbs of Montreal, it is necessary that the said territory be created into a separate municipality and they have prayed, that the general principles of the Cities and Towns' Act be applied to the said municipality and also that they be granted several powers similar to those of other suburbs of Montreal which are not contained in said act . . .
With the creation of the town came to need to put infrastructure and services in place. The only way for citizens to reach nearby Montreal was by rail, through the Grand Trunk Railway or the Montreal and Southern Counties Railway. In 1913, Greenfield Park, along with neighbouring municipalities St. Lambert, Montreal South and Longueuil, built a shared sewer system and water filtration plant. The town also used artesian wells as a source for drinking water.

World War I and II
During World War I, such a high percentage of Greenfield Parkers served in the Canadian forces that regular town meetings could not be held. Similarly, in World War II, Greenfield Park was the Canadian community that had one of the highest participation rate of military volunteers for its size. This fact was recognized by both Prime Minister William Lyon Mackenzie King and the Minister of National Defence, J.L. Ralston.

Following the war, returning veterans were able to purchase homes with financial assistance through a purchasing program put into place by the town.

Late 20th Century
In the early 1960s, Greenfield Park acquired 40 percent more land by annexing part of Saint-Hubert. This land was located on the opposite side of Taschereau, and A large amount of veterans housing was built on these lands, particularly along Bellevue Street North. During the early 60s, over 60% of the town's population traced their ancestry to the United Kingdom, roughly half of that number live in the town today.

Merger with Longueuil
Greenfield Park was a town until January 1, 2002, when it along with several other suburbs on Montreal's South Shore were merged into the amalgamated city of Longueuil. (On January 1, 2006, Boucherville, Brossard, Saint-Bruno-de-Montarville and Saint-Lambert were "demerged", or reconstituted.) Following these demergers, Greenfield Park became one of only three remaining boroughs of Longueuil, along with Saint-Hubert and Le Vieux-Longueuil.

Government

Municipal
Greenfield Park is represented by one city councillor in Longueuil City Council and two borough councillors. The borough president is Sylvain Joly of Option Greenfield Park, which joined Coalition Longueuil. As of the November 7, 2021 Longueuil municipal election (see 2021_Quebec_municipal_elections#Longueuil), the current borough council consists of the following councillors:

Coat of Arms
Greenfield Park's coat of arms is golden, with a sable reversed chevron. The chevron supports a sinople coloured tree. Below the chevron are two red roses. Above the shield is a crown, shaped like a wall with five turrets. The shield is surrounded by branches of maple. Below the shield the branches meet, tied with a red and black ribbon. The Greenfield Park motto, "Fortis Fortunam Superat," or "Fortune Favors the Brave," is attributed to Villar.

Federal and provincial
Greenfield Park is in the federal riding of Longueuil—Charles-LeMoyne and its Member of Parliament is Sherry Romanado (Liberal Party of Canada). It also belongs to the provincial riding of Laporte and its Member of the National Assembly is Nicole Ménard (Quebec Liberal Party).

Demographics

{| class="wikitable" | align="center"
|+Home language|-
! Language
! Population
! Percentage (%)
|-
| French
| 8,005
| 47.13%
|-
| English
| 6,765
| 39.83%
|-
| Both English and French
| 385
| 2.27%
|-
| Other languages
| 1,825
| 10.74%
|}

Education

The Riverside School Board operates public schools.

The South Shore Protestant Regional School Board previously served the municipality.Primary Greenfield Park International/École Internationale de Greenfield Park
 St-Jude Elementary
 École Primaire Pierre LaporteSecondary Centennial Regional High School
 École Secondaire Participative l'Agora
 École Internationale Saint-EdmondAdult Education'''
 CEA des 16–18 ans

Attractions
There are nine parks in Greenfield Park: Fairfield Park, Iellamo Park, Jubilee Park, Empire Park, Regent Park, René-Veillet Park, Saint-Judes Park, Stephen-Olynyk Park and Watson Park. Empire Park hosts junior football and baseball teams. Cynthia Coull Arena hosts the local minor hockey association.

There are seven churches in Greenfield Park. There are two Roman Catholic churches, Saint Mary Church serves anglophones and Église Sainte-Marguerite-Bourgeoys serves francophones. There are four Protestantism churches, St. Paul's Anglican Church (Anglican), Greenfield Park United Church (United Church of Canada), Greenfield Park Baptist Church (Baptist), South Shore Community Church (Pentecostal) and Latter Day Saint (Mormon).

Shopping centres are located on Taschereau Boulevard and include 5000 Taschereau (formerly Mail Carnaval), Place Greenfield Park and Les Galeries Taschereau.

Transport

Réseau de transport de Longueuil
Bus service in Greenfield Park is provided by the Réseau de transport de Longueuil.

Important roadways
 Victoria Avenue
 Churchill Boulevard
 Taschereau Boulevard

Notable people

Paul Adey, international hockey player
Ian Boothby, comic book writer, comedian
Cynthia Coull, former Olympic figure skater
Sylvain Couturier, hockey player
Maxime Crépeau, soccer player
Steven Crowder, actor, right wing American political commentator was raised in Greenfield Park.
Elisha Cuthbert, actress
Garry Galley, former NHL player
Steve Green, professional baseball player
Émilie Heymans, Olympic diver
Connie Kaldor,  Canadian folk singer/songwriter
Anthony Kavanagh, stand-up comic
Charline Labonte, hockey goaltender who won a gold medal for Canada at the 2014 Sochi Winter Olympics.
Julie Masse, singer
Torrey Mitchell, NHL player
Isabelle Morneau, soccer player
Craig Norman, basketball coach
Nils Oliveto, actor/screenwriter
Kevin Parent, singer/songwriter
Stéphane Roy, electroacoustic music composer
Jerome Samson, NHL player
Myriane Samson, figure skater
Julie Snyder, television presenter
Tod Fennell, actor, voice actor
Wally Weir, former NHL player

Geographic location

See also
 Municipal reorganization in Quebec
 List of mayors of Longueuil
 Longueuil City Council
 Boroughs of Longueuil
 Urban agglomeration of Longueuil

References

External links and publications
Official website for former city of Greenfield Park (archives)
  

Former municipalities in Quebec
Boroughs of Longueuil
Populated places established in 1911
Populated places disestablished in 2002
1911 establishments in Quebec
2002 disestablishments in Quebec